Buntok (abbreviated: BTK), a sub-district in the district of Dusun Selatan, is the regency seat of South Barito Regency and also one of the towns in Central Kalimantan province, Indonesia. This town is also called Buntok Kota by the people from Central Kalimantan. This town is at a distance of 197 km east of Palangka Raya city, the capital of Central Kalimantan Province. The population of this town is roughly 16,864 people as of 2020.

Geography 

Buntok Kota is precisely located at 1.71903 South and 114.84475 East. The town is located to the east of Palangka Raya, the capital of Central Kalimantan with the distance about 197 km. The total area of this town is around 79 km² which makes it roughly 0.9% of the total area of South Barito Regency.

Buntok Kota is crossed by the Barito River as it is one of the towns located in the Barito River basin. This town is situated on the flatlands of eastern Central Kalimantan with the altitude being 13 to 30 metres above sea level. As any other town in Kalimantan, Buntok Kota experiences tropical rainforest climate (Af) with high amounts of precipitation nearly all year long, constant humidity and warm-to-hot temperature above 21°C.

Demographics 
The total population of Buntok Kota as of 2021 is 16,774 inhabitants which represents 28% of the population of Dusun Selatan district and 12.7% of the entire population of South Barito Regency. The population density of this town is about 233 people/km². Buntok Kota has approximately 5,262 households and the average household size of the town is roughly 3.18 people. The sex ratio in Buntok Kota is equally 100 which means there are 100 males to every 100 females.

Education 
As of 2021, there are currently 22 primary schools (19 public schools and three private schools), seven middle schools (three public schools and four private schools), six high schools (three public schools and three private schools), one public vocational school, one economic college, and one Islamic college.

Facilities 
For healthcare facility, Buntok currently has one general hospital, three polyclinics, one public health centre, and seven pharmacies. For economic & trade facility, this town recently has five shopping complexes, two markets, six convenience shops, 234 grocery stores, 25 restaurants, 22 food stalls, six hotels, and seven inns. For religious facility, Buntok has 28 Islamic religious facilities, ten Protestant churches, and one Catholic church. This town is also served by the Sanggu Airport located at the neighbouring sub-district of Sanggu.

Reference 

Populated places in Central Kalimantan
Regency seats of Central Kalimantan
South Barito Regency